Sphingosine-1-phosphate receptor 5 also known as S1PR5 is a human gene which encodes a G protein-coupled receptor which binds the lipid signaling molecule sphingosine 1-phosphate (S1P).  Hence this receptor is also known as S1P5.

Agonists 

 A-971432
 Sphingosine 1-phosphate receptor agonists: a patent review (2010-2012)

See also 
 Lysophospholipid receptor

References

Further reading

External links 
 
 

G protein-coupled receptors